The 1938 National Challenge Cup was the annual open cup held by the United States Football Association now known as the Lamar Hunt U.S. Open Cup. Scheduled as follows: First Round on or before January 16, Second Round on or before January 30, Quarterfinals February 13, Semifinals East February 26, 27, West February 20, 27.

Eastern Division

Western Division

a) aggregate after 3 games

Final

First game

Second game

Sources
St. Louis Post-Dispatch

U.S. Open Cup
Nat